National Secondary Route 148, or just Route 148 (or ) is a National Road Route of Costa Rica, located in the Alajuela province.

Description
In Alajuela province the route covers Naranjo canton (Naranjo, San Juan, Palmitos districts), Palmares canton (Palmares, Buenos Aires districts).

References

Highways in Costa Rica